Karystia was one of the provinces of the Euboea Prefecture, Greece. Its territory corresponded with that of the current municipalities Karystos, Kymi-Aliveri, and Skyros. It was abolished in 2006.

References

Provinces of Greece
Euboea